Akilles "Aki" Eero Johannes Järvinen (19 September 1905 – 7 March 1943) was a Finnish decathlete. He competed at the 1928, 1932 and 1936 Olympics and won two silver medals, in 1928 and 1932; he served as the Finnish flag bearer at all three games. He also won a European silver medal in the 400 m hurdles in 1934.

Järvinen was one of Finland's most versatile athletes of his era. At the national level, his decathlon records are still competitive, and if the current decathlon points tables had been used, Järvinen would have won the gold medal at the 1928 and 1932 Olympics.

Järvinen died in 1943 when his VL Pyry trainer aircraft crashed during a test flight. His younger brother Matti was an Olympic champion and 10-time world-record breaker in javelin throw. His elder brother Kalle was an Olympic shot putter, whereas their father Verner won one gold and two bronze Olympic medals in the discus throw.

He was killed during a test flight in World War II.

Personal records
 100 m – 10.9 s (1934)
 200 m – 21.9 s (1930)
 400 m – 49.1 s (1931)
 1500 m – 4:42.0 s (1928)
 110 m hurdles – 15.2 s (1930)
 200 m hurdles – 25.4 s (1936)
 400 m hurdles – 53.7 s (1934)
 High jump – 180 cm (1925)
 Pole vault – 360 cm (1930)
 Long jump – 7.12 m (1930)
 Triple jump – 14.34 m (1926)
 Shot put – 14.10 m (1936)
 Discus – 37.94 m (1931)
 Javelin – 63.25 m (1933)
 Decathlon – 8292 (1932, using 1912 scoring tables)

References

External links

decathlonusa.org (Article contains picture of Järvinen with the other two decathlon medalists in the 1932 Los Angeles Olympics.)

1905 births
1943 deaths
Sportspeople from Jyväskylä
People from Vaasa Province (Grand Duchy of Finland)
Finnish decathletes
Olympic athletes of Finland
Olympic silver medalists for Finland
Athletes (track and field) at the 1928 Summer Olympics
Athletes (track and field) at the 1932 Summer Olympics
Athletes (track and field) at the 1936 Summer Olympics
European Athletics Championships medalists
Medalists at the 1932 Summer Olympics
Medalists at the 1928 Summer Olympics
Olympic silver medalists in athletics (track and field)
Finnish military personnel killed in World War II
20th-century Finnish people